Planet B is a science fiction drama series first broadcast on BBC Radio 7 on 2 March 2009 as part of BBC Radio's science fiction season between February and March 2009. Planet B is set in a virtual world called "Planet B" (voiced by Adjoa Andoh) in which people play as life-size avatars. The first series follows John Armstrong (played by Gunnar Cauthery in Series 1 and 3) who attempts to find girlfriend Lioba Fielding (Donnla Hughes in Series 1, Tessa Nicholson in Series 2) who is dead in the real world but alive in Planet B. As he travels between various worlds he becomes entangled in an array of strange scenarios, teleporting from each adventure to the next with his companion Medley (Lizzy Watts in Series 1, Claire Harry in Series 3), a "rogue avatar" who has no human controller. All the while, John and Medley are being watched by a dog-like antivirus programme called Cerberus (Chris Pavlo) who, along with the Planet B Corporation, considers the rogues to be a computer virus that need to be wiped out.

In the second series, Lioba is on the run from Planet B and travels the virtual world with computer games expert Kip Berenger (Joseph Cohen-Cole in Series 2, Lloyd Thomas in Series 3) after they are attacked by Cerberus.

The third series revolves around the impending shut-down of Planet B in favour of the upgraded Planet B Platinum.

The drama series was created by Sam Hoyle, Jessica Dromgoole and Matthew Broughton with James Robinson. The first series ran for ten episodes and was BBC Radio 7's biggest ever commission for an original drama series.

Episodes

Series 1

Series 2

Series 3

References
General
 
 
 

Specific

Lists of radio series episodes
BBC Radio 7 (rebranded) programmes